Some of the longest-serving mayors in the United States are listed according to their length of service in that currently or has served in that part of the state or legislative office. The office of mayor is the highest ranking local official and responsibilities may vary from ceremonial (see weak mayor) to full-time responsibility for city operations (see strong mayor).

Current serving mayors
A list of mayors still in office and ordered by their length of continuous service in that office. (If there is a break in their service, then this length is measured from their return to the office.)

The longest-serving current mayor of one of the 50 largest cities in the United States is Greg Fischer, who has been mayor of Louisville, Kentucky since January 3, 2011.

Former mayors
A list of mayors in order of their total length of service. (If there is a break in their service, then this length is measured as the sum of their terms.)

Notes

References

United States mayors
Mayors
Longest serving